BlindArt is a British charity which was established in 2004 to educate the public about the needs of people who are visually impaired and to promote the idea that lack of sight need not be a barrier to the creation and enjoyment of works of art. BlindArt exhibitions typically contain paintings, sculptures, installations and other works of art which have been designed to engage all the senses. BlindArt pieces are created both by sighted artists or by artists who are blind or partially sighted.

BlindArt was founded in 2004 by the Iranian born artist Sheri Khayami, who has been visually impaired since childhood. The charity gained national attention in the United Kingdom following its 2005 Sense and Sensuality exhibition at the Royal College of Art in London. The exhibition was made up of pieces created by the finalists of the UK's first annual competition to create pieces of artwork that can be appreciated by visually impaired people. Annual competitions have been held since, with pieces of artwork from the exhibition for sale and proceeds used to create a National BlindArt Collection.

Unlike conventional art exhibitions, visitors to BlindArt exhibitions are encouraged to touch and interact with the exhibits, with latex and cotton gloves provided for this purpose. The experience is enhanced through the use of audio-description and braille signage. Plinths are also specially designed to allow wheelchair access.

In September 2009, the National BlindArt Collection was given a permanent home at the Royal National College for the Blind in Hereford, where it can be viewed by the public.

See also
Blind artists

References

External links
 BlindArt website
 BlindArt at RNC - Royal National College for the Blind website
 

Blindness organisations in the United Kingdom
Health charities in the United Kingdom
Disability rights organizations
Arts organizations established in 2004
Charities based in London
 
Royal National College for the Blind